Yuxarı Tala (also, Birindzhi-Tala and Yukhary-Tala) is a village and municipality in the Zaqatala Rayon of Azerbaijan. It has a population of 7,386.  The municipality consists of the villages of Yuxarı Tala, Çudulubinə, Laqodexbinə, and Meşleş.

References

External links

Populated places in Zaqatala District